A wish is a hope or a desire.

Wish, WISH or The Wish may also refer to:

Film, television and radio 
Wish or Hope, a 2013 South Korean film directed by Lee Joon-ik
Wish, an upcoming 2023 film from Walt Disney Animation Studios
"The Wish," a 1998 Buffy the Vampire Slayer episode
Eleanor Wish, a fictional character in the TV series Bosch
Wish FM, a radio station in Merseyside, UK
WISH-FM, a radio station (98.9 FM) licensed to Galatia, Illinois, US
WISH-TV, a television station licensed to Indianapolis, Indiana, US

Music

Albums
Wish (The Cure album), 1992
Wish (Feargal Sharkey album), 1988
Wish (2009 Janice Vidal album) or the title song
Wish (2010 Janice Vidal album) or the title song
Wish (Joshua Redman album) or the title song (see below), 1993
Wish (Reamonn album) or the title song, 2006
Wish (Sutton Foster album), 2009
Wish (Yuna Ito album) or the title song, 2008

Songs
"Wish" (Arashi song), 2005
"Wish" (Nine Inch Nails song), 1992
"Wish"/"Starless Night", by Olivia, 2006
"Wish", by Alien Ant Farm from ANThology, 2001
"Wish", by Basement from Colourmeinkindness, 2012
"Wish", by BTS from BTS World: Original Soundtrack, 2019
"Wish", by Denzel Curry from Zuu, 2019
"Wish", by Diplo and Trippie Redd from California, later on Life's a Trip, 2018
"Wish", by Donna Cruz and Jason Everly, 1996
"Wish", by Flying Saucer Attack from Flying Saucer Attack, 1993
"Wish", by Joshua Redman from Joshua Redman, 1993
"Wish", by Soul II Soul from Volume IV The Classic Singles 88–93, 1993
 "The Wish", by Bruce Springsteen from Tracks, 1998

Organizations and companies
Wish (charity), a UK-based mental health charity working with women
Wish (company), an e-commerce website
Women's Institute of Science & Humanities, Pakistan

Other uses
Wish (manga), a 1996 shojo manga series created by Clamp
wish (Unix shell), a windowing shell for Tcl
Wireless intelligent stream handling, a way to prioritize wireless network traffic
Charles Wish (born 1971), American painter
, Disney cruise ship named Wish
Toyota Wish, a minivan
The Wish (novel), by Gail Carson Levine

See also
Wishes (disambiguation)
Wished (film), a 2017 film
Whish, a surname